Stalwart-class auxiliary general ocean surveillance ships (T-AGOS) were a class of United States Naval Ship (USNS) auxiliary support Ocean Surveillance Ships commissioned between April 1984 and January 1990. Their original purpose was to collect underwater acoustical information using the Surveillance Towed Array Sensor System (SURTASS), a towed array passive sonar.

Stalwart, Indomitable, and Capable were modified to support narcotics interdiction by removing SURTASS equipment and adding an air-search radar and tactical data link equipment.

Units

References

 
Auxiliary surveillance ship classes
Auxiliary research ship classes
Ships built by Tacoma Boatbuilding Company